The 1995 Australian Touring Car season was the 36th year of touring car racing in Australia since the first runnings of the Australian Touring Car Championship and the fore-runner of the present day Bathurst 1000, the Armstrong 500.

Two major touring car categories raced in Australia during 1995, V8 Supercar and Super Touring. Between them there were 24 touring car race meetings held during 1995; a ten-round series for V8 Supercars, the 1995 Australian Touring Car Championship (ATCC); an eight-round series for Super Touring, the 1995 Australian Super Touring Championship (ASTC); support programme events at the 1995 Australian Grand Prix and 1995 Indycar Australia, two stand alone long-distance races, nicknamed 'enduros'; the fourth and final running of the Winfield Triple Challenge at Eastern Creek Raceway and the TAC Peter Brock Classic held at Calder Park Raceway.

Results and standings

Race calendar
The 1995 Australian touring car season consisted of 24 events.

Winfield Triple Challenge
Held at Eastern Creek Raceway this was a pre-season race meeting which featured superbikes and drag racing as well as touring cars to complete the Winfield Triple Challenge.

Australian Touring Car Championship

Australian Super Touring Championship

Gold Coast Super Touring Cup

This meeting was a support event of the 1995 Indycar Australia at the Surfers Paradise Street Circuit, and considered part of the Gold Coast 600 history.

Sandown 500

Tooheys 1000

Clipsal 2.0L Super Touring Car Trophy
This meeting was a support event of the 1995 Australian Grand Prix.

EDS Five-Litre V8 Touring Cars
This meeting was a support event of the 1995 Australian Grand Prix.

TAC Peter Brock Classic Super Touring
This meeting was a one-off celebration of the career of Peter Brock held at Calder Park Raceway.

TAC Peter Brock Classic
This meeting was a one-off celebration of the career of Peter Brock held at Calder Park Raceway.

References

Linked articles contain additional references.

Australian Touring Car Championship
Supercar seasons
Touring Cars
1995 in V8 Supercars

sv:ATCC 1995